The See of Cilicia may refer to:

 Holy See of Cilicia, officially Armenian Catholicossate of the Great House of Cilicia, one of the two catholicossates of the Armenian Apostolic Church
 Armenian Catholic Patriarchate of Cilicia, called the Patriarchate of Cilicia, of the Armenian Catholic Church